Myanmar participated in the 2014 Asian Games in Incheon, South Korea from 19 September to 4 October 2014.

Medalists

Archery

Athletics

Judo

Sepaktakraw

Taekwondo

Shooting

Ye Tun Naung

Volleyball

Weightlifting

Wrestling

Wushu

References

Nations at the 2014 Asian Games
2014
Asian Games